The 1967 British Open Championship was held at the Lansdowne Club in London from 12–21 December 1966. Jonah Barrington won the title defeating Aftab Jawaid in the final to become the first British winner since 1938.

Seeds

Draw and results

First round

Second round

Main draw

+ Shafik withdrew after breaking his hand in practice.

Third Place
 Muhammad Yasin beat  Ibrahim Amin 9-1 9-6 10-9

References

Men's British Open Championship
Men's British Open Squash Championship
Men's British Open Squash Championship
Men's British Open Squash Championship
Squash competitions in London